Grindheim is a former municipality in the old Vest-Agder county, Norway.  The administrative centre was the village of Byremo where Grindheim Church is located.  The  municipality existed from 1902 until its dissolution in 1964. It was generally located in the northern part of the present-day municipality of Lyngdal in what is now Agder county.

History
The municipality of Grindum was established on 1 January 1902 when the old municipality of Bjelland og Grindum was divided into two separate municipalities: Grindheim (population: 909) and Bjelland (population: 907).

During the 1960s, there were many municipal mergers across Norway due to the work of the Schei Committee. During the 1960s, there were many municipal mergers across Norway due to the work of the Schei Committee. On 1 January 1964, Grindheim (population: 701) was merged with the Ågedal and Midtbø areas (located just east of the lake Ytre Øydnavatnet; population: 96) in Bjelland and the neighboring municipality of Konsmo (population: 712) to create the new municipality of Audnedal.

Name
The municipality (originally the parish) was named after the old Grindheim farm, since the first Grindheim Church was built there.  The first element is grind which means "gate" or "wicket" (or possibly grind which means "sand" or "gravel") and the last element is heimr which means "home", "homestead", or "farm".

Prior to 1889, the name was written as Grindem.  Then from 1889 to 1917, the spelling was changed to Grindum.  Then again in 1918, the spelling was changed to its present form: Grindheim.

Government
All municipalities in Norway, including Grindheim, are responsible for primary education (through 10th grade), outpatient health services, senior citizen services, unemployment and other social services, zoning, economic development, and municipal roads.  The municipality was governed by a municipal council of elected representatives, which in turn elected a mayor.

Municipal council
The municipal council  of Grindheim was made up of representatives that were elected to four year terms.  The party breakdown of the final municipal council was as follows:

See also
List of former municipalities of Norway

References

Lyngdal
Former municipalities of Norway
1902 establishments in Norway
1964 disestablishments in Norway